Shukhov Rotunda was a round exhibition pavilion built for All-Russia Exhibition 1896 in Nizhny Novgorod, Russia. It was built in 1896 with a diagrid hanging cover (tensile gridshell – diagrid roof, Russian Empire patent No. 1894, dated March 12, 1899) and was the world's first Hyperboloid structure (in the center of the Rotunda). It is named after Vladimir Shukhov, who designed it in 1895.

The rotunda was subsequently moved to Yessentuki and demolished in the 1980s.

See also

References

Sources
 "The Nijni-Novgorod exhibition: Water tower, room under construction, springing of 91 feet span", "The Engineer", № 19.3.1897, P.292-294, London, 1897.
 
 Elizabeth C. English: “Arkhitektura i mnimosti”: The origins of Soviet avant-garde rationalist architecture in the Russian mystical-philosophical and mathematical intellectual tradition”, a dissertation in architecture, 264 p., University of Pennsylvania, 2000.
 

 
 

 Шухов В. Г.: Избранные труды, том 1, «Строительная механика», 192 стр., под ред. А. Ю. Ишлинского, Академия наук СССР, Москва, 1977.
 Грефе Р. и др.:  «В. Г. Шухов (1853—1939). Искусство конструкции.», «Мир», Москва, 1994, .
 Шухова Е. М.: «Владимир Григорьевич Шухов. Первый инженер России.», 368 стр., Изд. МГТУ, Москва, 2003, .

Lattice shell structures by Vladimir Shukhov
Tensile membrane structures
Roof structures by Vladimir Shukhov
Structural system
Tensile architecture
Rotundas in Europe
Buildings and structures in Nizhny Novgorod
Culture in Nizhny Novgorod